Constance Ella Glynn (born 16 March 1994) is an English Internet celebrity, author, and cosplayer.

Early life
Glynn is from Hatfield, Hertfordshire. She and her brother attended St. Christopher School in Letchworth on a bursary. She took classes at Guildhall School of Music & Drama as a teenager. After graduating from the University of Sussex with a Bachelor of Arts in Film Studies in 2016, Glynn moved to London.

Career
Glynn started the Noodlerella blog on Tumblr, where she would post about Disney, anime, and video games. This translated into her YouTube channel, where she uploaded her first video doing Disney impressions in January 2013. She became known on the Internet for her pink-loving "Noodlerella" persona and fashion sense, impressions, and love of cartoons and Disney, and cosplay. In 2016, Glynn started a second channel, originally named NoodleVlogs and later Connie.

Glynn voiced the role of Moxie Dewdrop in the UK edition of the 2016 DreamWorks film Trolls.

In 2017, Glynn signed a three-book deal with the aim of five books with Penguin Random House for a young adult fairytale series The Rosewood Chronicles largely based on Glynn's own experiences at boarding school. The first installment in the series, Undercover Princess made her the top debut author in the young adult genre in the UK in 2017. Undercover Princess was followed by Princess-in-Practice and The Lost Princess in 2018 and 2019 respectively. With these came book tours.

In 2018, Glynn moved away from her Noodlerella persona, and in August 2019, she rebranded away from "the colour pink" as part of her identity and aesthetic as she decided to focus more on writing and music with her band Snaggletooth.

Glynn revealed the cover for Princess at Heart in October 2020, the fourth book in The Rosewood Chronicles series. It was released in February 2021. Glynn announced the title for the series' fifth and final installment, Princess Ever After in July 2021, set for a February 2022 release date.

Personal life
Glynn identified as aromantic and bisexual, however in 2021 made a video on her side channel coming out as a lesbian. Glynn uses both they and she pronouns.

Glynn was hit by a car in November 2016 and broke her leg. She had surgery twice. In May 2019, she opened up about the PTSD and subsequent agoraphobia and paranoia she experienced in the years following the accident.

Bibliography

The Rosewood Chronicles
Undercover Princess (2017)
Princess in Practice (2018)
The Lost Princess (2019)
Princess at Heart (2021)
Princess Ever After (2022)

Awards and nominations

References

External links
 

Living people
1994 births
21st-century English women writers
Alumni of the University of Sussex
Aromantic women
English lesbian writers
British writers of young adult literature
Cosplayers
English women novelists
English YouTubers
English LGBT entertainers
English LGBT novelists
LGBT YouTubers
People educated at St Christopher School, Letchworth
People from Hatfield, Hertfordshire
Women writers of young adult literature
20th-century LGBT people
21st-century LGBT people
British Internet celebrities